Yuri Kondratiev (born October 23, 1953, in Kyiv, USSR) is a Ukrainian mathematician, professor at the Bielefeld University, Germany.

 His research interests include functional analysis, mathematical physics and stochastic calculus.
 Y. Kondratiev is a member of the Kyiv school of functional analysis founded by M. Krein and lead, for many years, by Y. Berezansky.
 His interests in mathematical physics were inspired by cooperation with the Moscow seminar in statistical Physics (R. Dobrushin, R. Minlos, Y. Sinai). Yuri's collaboration with A. Skorokhod has influenced most of his subsequent papers on stochastics.

Biography 

 In 1975, Yuri Kondratiev graduated with honours from Kyiv University.
 In 1979 he completed his Candidate of Sciences with thesis entitled “Generalized functions in problems of infinite dimensional analysis” at the Kyiv University. 
 In 1987 Yuri obtained the Degree of Doctor of Sciences in the area "Spectral Analysis of Infinite Dimensional Elliptic Differential Operators”.
 Since 1991 Yuri has worked in Ukraine (Institute of Mathematics of the National Academy of Sciences of Ukraine, National Pedagogical Dragomanov University) as well as in Germany (University of Bonn, Bielefeld University) and the UK (University of Reading).  Since 2008 he holds a full Professor position at the Bielefeld University.

Work 

 He has written a book entitled "Spectral Methods in Infinite Dimensional Analysis" 1, 2 (1988, with Y. Berezansky, in Russian; translated into English in 1995).
 He co-authored a monograph "The Statistical Mechanics of Quantum Lattice Systems" (with S. Albeverio, Y. Kozitsky and M. Röckner).
 Together with S. Albeverio and M. Röckner Yuri initiated a systematical study of Continuous Configuration Spaces. One space of stochastic distributions is named after him («Kondratiev space»).

Selected articles 
 Analysis and geometry on configuration spaces (with S. Albeverio and M. Rökner), J. Funct. Anal., 154, 444–500 (1998).
 Analysis and geometry on configuration spaces: The Gibbsian case, J. Funct. Anal., 157, 242–291 (1998).
 Harmonic analysis on configuration spaces I. General theory (with T. Kuna), IDAQP, 5, 201–233 (2002).
 On contact processes in continuum (with A. Skorokhod), IDAQP, 9, 187–198 (2006).
 Semigroup approach to non-equilibrium birth-and-death stochastic dynamics in continuum (with D. Finkelshtein and O. Kutovyi),J. Funct. Anal. 262, no. 3, 1274–1308 (2012).

References 
 Bielefeld University
 Mathematics Genealogy

1953 births
Living people
20th-century Ukrainian mathematicians
Scientists from Kyiv
Laureates of the State Prize of Ukraine in Science and Technology
21st-century Ukrainian mathematicians